The 2002 Audi presents Petit Le Mans was the tenth and final round of the 2002 American Le Mans Series season.  It took place at Road Atlanta, Georgia, on October 12, 2002.

Official results
Class winners in bold.

Statistics
 Pole Position - #1 Audi Sport North America - 1:12.343
 Fastest Lap - #1 Audi Sport North America - 1:11.877
 Distance - 1610.567 km
 Average Speed - 170.232 km/h

External links
 
 World Sports Racing Prototypes - Race Results

P
Petit Le Mans